The 2018-19 Minnesota Duluth Bulldogs men's ice hockey season was the 75th season of play for the program and the 7th in the NCHC conference. The Bulldogs represented the University of Minnesota Duluth and were coached by Scott Sandelin, in his 19th season.

Season
Coming off of the program's second national championship, Duluth was ranked #1 in the preseason polls. With most of their principle scorers and virtually the entire defensive corps returning, the team was in a tremendous position to repeat. Leading the way, however, was the Bulldog's star goaltender, Hunter Shepard who would live up to his billing as one of if not the best goaltender in the nation.

Duluth stumbled out of the gate, losing a weekend to old rival Minnesota, but then reeled off eight consecutive victories, including a sweep of then #1 Notre Dame, to reclaim their top position. The Bulldogs went through a bit of a rough patch in the middle of the season, going more than two months (including the winter break) without sweeping a weekend. The up and down play dropped them to #5 in the polls but the Bulldogs were never really in jeopardy of missing out on the NCAA tournament. UMD ended the regular season with a showdown between two of the top teams in the nation when they met St. Cloud State. While they dropped both games, Duluth lost by just a single goal on each occasion and pushed one of the contests into overtime.

The Bulldogs opened their postseason with a relatively easy opponent in Omaha but still struggled in the two games. Duluth had been a defensive powerhouse all season long but their offense was rather pedestrian. With UMD going 1-for-10 on the power play and needing overtime to finish off a team that was 13 games under .500, there was little doubt that it would be up to Shepard and the defense to carry them through the rest of the playoffs.

Luckily, the Bulldogs were already battle-tested and stood strong in the Frozen Faceoff. Shepard posted his 6th shutout of the season against Denver to set up a showdown for conference bragging right with St. Cloud State. After exchanging goals in the first, the match turned into a defensive struggle but the Huskies pulled ahead at the beginning of the third period. After failing to capitalize on their third man-advantage of the game, Duluth was forced to kill off a tripping penalty with just over 6 minutes remaining. The Bulldogs could not afford to fall down by two with their offensive struggles and rallied to keep the puck out of the net. In a dramatic turn of events, St. Cloud coughed up the puck in their own during the power play and could only watch as Tanner Laderoute found a wide-open Billy Exell in the slot who tied the game on only his second goal of the season. The goaltending duel resumed afterwards and remained in place for the rest of the game. Near the mid-way point of the second overtime, Nick Swaney ended the game in dramatic fashion and gave Duluth the conference championship.

While St. Cloud State remained as the #1 team in spite of the loss, Duluth was able to rise up to #2 after winning the NCHC title. The Bulldogs travelled to Allentown for the midwest regional and faced #15 Bowling Green in their opening game, a rematch of the 1984 championship game. Despite being heavily favored in the match, Duluth's offense was lacking and UMD entered the third period down 0–1. After coming up empty on their fourth power play opportunity of the game and will less than 5 minutes remaining in the contest it appeared that UMD's luck was about to run out. Fortunately for the Bulldogs, Parker Mackay had other ideas. Mackay finally beat Ryan Bednard for Duluth's first goal of the game with just 3:01 left in regulation. Mackay then ended the game in overtime with his 14th of the season and allow Minnesota Duluth to survive and advance.

Duluth appeared to relax after the first victory in the tournament and strangled the offenses of their succeeding opponents. In the next game, Quinnipiac managed their only goal of the game after pulling their goaltender while on the power play. However, an empty-net goal from Parker Mackay shortly afterwards ended the Bobcats' comeback attempt. The national semifinal too saw UMD surrendering one power play marker but Billy Excell's third goal of the season proved to be the game-winner over Providence.

The championship game pitted Duluth against Massachusetts, who possessed the #2 offense in the nation as well as the Hobey Baker Award winner, Cale Makar. Duluth was undaunted and constrained the Minutemen for the entire match. The Bulldog defense snuffed out every attempt on goal and limited UMass to just 18 shots for the game. In the meantime, Parker Mackay opened the scoring on the man-advantage, scoring the first power play goal for Duluth in 7 games. After ending the 0-for-16 streak just 4 minutes into the match, Duluth played like they knew they were going to win the game. The Bulldogs scored once in each period but completely dominated the contest. There was very little drama in the game but that didn't dampen the team's celebration in the slightest and UMD became the first team in 14 years to repeat as national champions.

Departures

Recruiting

Roster
As of September 8, 2019.

Standings

Schedule and Results

|-
!colspan=12 style=";" | Regular Season

|-
!colspan=12 style=";" | 

|-
!colspan=12 style=";" | 

|-
!colspan=12 style=";" |

Scoring Statistics

Goaltending statistics

Rankings

Note: USCHO did not release a poll in weeks 11, 12, and 25.

Awards and honors

Players drafted into the NHL

2019 NHL Entry Draft

† incoming freshman

References

Minnesota Duluth Bulldogs men's ice hockey seasons
Minnesota Duluth 
Minnesota Duluth 
Minnesota Duluth 
Minnesota Duluth
Minnesota Duluth
Minnesota Duluth